Sarah Washington (born Sarah Warwick)  is a British pop, electronic dance and hi-NRG singer. During the 1990s, Washington had four singles reach the UK Singles Chart. She is probably most known for her dance-cover of "I Will Always Love You" which was released in 1993. It peaked at number 12 on the UK Singles Chart, number 15 in Ireland and number three in Spain. Later same year, she recorded a dance version of the George Michael hit "Careless Whisper" that peaked at number 45 in the UK. Almighty Records released an updated version of the song with new versions in 2012.

In 1996, after Washington got signed under major label AM:PM, the singles "Heaven" and "Everything", made it to number 28 and number 30, respectively. "Heaven" also spent one week at number 50 on the US Billboard Hot Dance Club Play chart in July 1996. Working with Stereolove, Australian DJ James Fraser, a new recording of "Heaven" was released on February 5, 2013.

She has also appeared in the Eurodance compilation Dancemania series including Dancemania Speed 2.

Singles

"I Will Always Love You"

Charts

"Careless Whisper"

Charts

"Heaven"

Critical reception
Larry Flick from Billboard wrote, "While on the AM:PM tip, be sure to check out Sarah Washington's uplifting vocal on the gospel-touched "Heaven", which sports meaty beats courtesy of Jazz'n'Groove."

Charts

Weekly charts

Year-end charts

"Everything"

Critical reception
Larry Flick from Billboard wrote, "Speaking of AM:PM, sprint to your fave import shop for a copy of "Everything" by Sarah Washington. It's essential to the collection of any disciple of fierce house divas. There are mixes to suit nearly every frame of mind or body, thanks to Farley & Heller, Mood II Swing, Mark Mendoza, Hippie Torales, and A&G Division." Daisy & Havoc from Music Week'''s RM'' Dance Update rated "Everything" four out of five. They added, "AM:PM continues its winning streak with this enormous vocal track, the follow-up to 'Heaven'. In fact, we prefer this to its predecessor — it's not the most original record you'll ever hear but the song is good and extremely catchy and the production by Tom Fredrikse and A&G Division (Marc Auerbach and Ian Green) is all very classy and interesting."

Charts

Weekly charts

Year-end charts

"Joy Is Free"

Charts

Discography
 1993 – "I Will Always Love You (Dance Mix)" (UK #12)
 1993 – "Careless Whisper" (UK #45)
 1996 – "Heaven" (UK #28)
 1996 – "Everything" (UK #30)
 1998 – "Joy Is Free" (Dive featuring Sarah Washington) (UK #88)
 2013 – "Heaven" (Stereolove feat. Sarah Washington)

References

External links
Further information website

Year of birth missing (living people)
English women singers
English women in electronic music
Eurodance musicians
British hi-NRG musicians
Living people
AM PM Records artists